zZz is a Dutch band from Amsterdam, founded in 2001, formed by Björn Ottenheim and Daan Schinkel. On their first album, the instruments of the band consisted of an organ and a drumkit. They have since incorporated other electronic and live elements into their sound. The duo makes dark, danceable rock music. The single "Ecstasy" was used in the soundtrack of the film Phileine zegt sorry and in an episode of the fourth season of Skins. In 2005, the band won an Essent Award and opened for Anouk in a few shows.

In 2007, they opened the exhibition Nederclips in Stedelijk Museum 's-Hertogenbosch SM's by recording a video for the track "Grip", with producer Roel Wouters, for a live Audience. "zZz is playing: Grip" has been screened at festivals all over the world. It has won best music video award at Festival du Clip in Paris and the Best Short Award at the Playgrounds festival in Tilburg. It was nominated as Best Animation for the Dutch Design Award 2008, as Best International Video at the MVA in London, for cutting edge Dutch music video at IAFF 2008.

The concept of the music video has been used in a Fiat Punto ad.

The song "O.F.G." was used in the soundtrack of the video game Driver: Parallel Lines. The song "Soul" is featured in the soundtrack of the video game Driver: San Francisco in 2011.

Band members 

 Björn Ottenheim - vocals, drums
 Daan Schinkel - organ

External links 
 

Musical groups from Amsterdam
Dutch indie rock groups
Rock music duos
Musical groups established in 2001